Procrica camerunica is a species of moth of the family Tortricidae. It is found in Cameroon.

References

	

Endemic fauna of Cameroon
Moths described in 2002
Archipini